The Glocknerhorn and Teufelshorn are two nearby mountain peaks in the Glockner Group in the Austrian Central Alps in the central part of the High Tauern. According to the literature, Teufelshorn is 3,677 metres high. The Austrian Federal Office for Metrology and Survey gives Glocknerhorn's elevation as 3,680 metres, but naming it "Teufelshorn" by mistake. Both lie on the Northwest Ridge (Nordwestgrat) of Austria's highest peak, the neighbouring Großglockner, along which the border between the Austrian federal states of Tyrol (East Tyrol) and Carinthia runs. The lower Teufelshorn in the west has a turret-like summit that juts about 30 metres above the massif itself and, together with the higher and similar-looking Glocknerhorn in the east, forms a twin peak. The Teufelshorn was first climbed on 8 August 1884 by Moriz von Kuffner, guided by Christian Ranggetiner and E. Rubesoier. The  Glocknerhorn, by contrast, had already been conquered on 29 August 1879 by the Alpinists, Gustav Gröger and Christian Ranggetiner.

References

Sources and maps 
Willi End: Glocknergruppe Alpine Club Guide, Bergverlag Rother, Munich, 2003, 
Eduard Richter: Die Erschliessung der Ostalpen, III. Band, Verlag des Deutschen und Oesterreichischen Alpenvereins, Berlin 1894
Alpine Club map 1:25.000, Bheet 40, Glocknergruppe

Mountains of the Alps
Glockner Group
Mountains of Carinthia (state)
Mountains of Tyrol (state)
Alpine three-thousanders